Frank Wickware (March 18, 1888 – November 2, 1967), nicknamed "Rawhide" and "The Red Ant", was a baseball pitcher in the Negro leagues from 1909 to 1925.

In a nationally syndicated article written in 1915, it was said that Wickware "is another negro pitcher who would rank with the Walter Johnsons, Joe Woods or Grover Alexanders if he were a white man." In the previous year, another article announced Wickware was striking out an average of 11 players per game, and in two games in a row struck out 34 batters.

Wickware's signature pitch seems to be a curveball that appeared to be a beanball, but "his control is so perfect" that it was said he never "hit a batter in the head." But batters would jump away from the plate, only to have his curveball arch into place over the plate.

His first wife Dottie traveled with the team. However, Wickware married again, Elizabeth McCann on May 18, 1915 in Chicago. His new wife followed him on a trip to California that year.

Wickware registered for the WWI Draft at the age of 29. He lists his birthplace as Girard, Kansas. And he lists his current address as 3450 Wabash in Chicago, Illinois. Wickware lists his occupation as base ball player, working for the American Giants of Chicago. He is listed as married and claims his wife and mother as dependents.

At age 64, Wickware received votes listing him on the 1952 Pittsburgh Courier player-voted poll of the Negro leagues' best players ever.

References

External links
 and Baseball-Reference Black Baseball stats and Seamheads
Negro League Baseball Museum

1888 births
1967 deaths
Brooklyn Royal Giants players
Chicago American Giants players
Chicago Giants players
Detroit Stars players
Indianapolis ABCs players
Leland Giants players
Lincoln Stars (baseball) players
Louisville White Sox (1914-1915) players
Lincoln Giants players
Philadelphia Giants players
St. Louis Giants players
Club Fé players
San Francisco Park players
Schenectady Mohawk Giants players
United States Army personnel of World War I
Baseball players from Kansas
People from Coffeyville, Kansas
African Americans in World War I
American expatriate baseball players in Cuba
African-American United States Army personnel